Bruce Lee Lives: The Fall of Hong Kong Palace, known simply as Bruce Lee Lives, is a 1989 video game with software developed and published by The Software Toolworks for MS-DOS and a promotional website developed and published by the creators of the Kung Faux television series and Bento Box Entertainment in homage to the video game's aesthetic.

Plot
The game stars the Jeet Kune Do founder and movie actor Bruce Lee and the plot takes place at the Hong Kong Palace, a peaceful place where martial artists practice in order to become professional warriors; however, a large group of thugs led by a vile name Master Po came to start the destruction of Hong Kong Palace. This caused the citizens of Hong Kong Palace to cry for the help of the martial arts legend Bruce Lee to end the destruction of Hong Kong Palace by defeating Master Po and his henchmen to bring back peace to Hong Kong Palace. You play the part of Bruce Lee in a battle against Master Po and his gang.

Gameplay

The object of the game is to beat the required number of opponents: from Bruce Lee's students to Master Po's servants. After defeating them, the final battle against Master Po awaits. Unlike most fighting games back then and nowadays, Bruce Lee Lives features a special AI engine that changes the difficulty level by focusing on the player's actions. If the player overuses one move in order to beat an opponent, the AI engine will reduce the player's chance at beating the next opponent with the same moves used so often against the previous opponent.  This leads the player to a challenge of beating opponents if they were controlled by the designers of the game, causing the opponents to identify the easiest ways to knock out Bruce Lee.

Feedback 

Rating: 4/5 (2 votes)

Description 
This martial arts game stars the Jeet Kune Do founder and movie actor Bruce Lee and features a "learning" AI engine that can improve its strategy by examining and tracking your past actions... thus the player cannot beat the game by just re-using the same successful moves over and over again. This amounts to a difficult game where "the opponents very often beat the program's designers!" The game also included a biography book titled Dragon's Tale: The Story of Bruce Lee, written by Bruce Lee's wife Linda.

See also
Dragon: The Bruce Lee Story (video game)

References

External links

 Bruce Lee Lives at Website

1989 video games
Bruce Lee video games
DOS games
DOS-only games
Fighting games
North America-exclusive video games
Video games set in Hong Kong
Video games developed in the United States
The Software Toolworks games